A person who is determined by the People's Courts of the People's Republic of China at All Levels to be "the executee who has the ability to perform but fails to fulfill the obligations determined by the effective legal documents", called the Defaulted executee or the court defaulters, commonly known as laolai or untrustworthy. According to the relevant regulations, all persons who are included in the "list of defaulted executors" by the People's Courts are subject to restrictions on high consumption and consumption not necessary for living or business

Background
According to statistics from the Supreme People's Court, the number of the cases concluded by people's courts at all levels from 2008 to 2012 in which the defendant had property, more than 70 percent of the defendants had evaded, avoided or even violently resisted enforcement, and less than 30 percent of them had automatically fulfilled their obligations. It is also reported that the chronic problems caused by the "laolai" have seriously affected the harmony and stability of the society.  To this end, at the end of August 2013, the Supreme People's Court issued "Several Provisions on the Publication of Information on the List of Defaulted Executees".

Inclusion procedure

Subject of disciplinary action 
According to the Decision of the Supreme People's Court on Amending the Several Provisions of the Supreme People's Court on the Publication of Information on the List of Executed Persons in Default of Trust adopted at the 1582nd meeting of the Judgment Committee of the Supreme People's Court on July 1, 2013 and amended according to the 1707th meeting of the Judgment Committee of the Supreme People's Court on January 16, 2017, the Supreme People's Court on the Publication of Information on the List of Executed Persons in Default" provides that the people's courts at all levels shall include them in the list of executed persons in default and impose credit discipline on them in accordance with the law:
 Those who have the ability to perform but refuse to fulfill their obligations as determined by the legal instruments in force.
 Obstructing or resisting execution by falsifying evidence, violence, threats, etc.
 Evading execution by means of false litigation, false arbitration, concealing or transferring property.
 Violation of the property reporting system.
 Violation of consumption restriction order.
 Refusing to fulfill the execution settlement agreement without justifiable reasons.

According to the "Regulations", the executee has the above provisions of the second to sixth circumstances, the period of inclusion in the list of persons who have failed to trust is 2 years; the executee to violence, threats to obstruct, resist the implementation of the circumstances are serious or have a number of breaches of trust, can be extended by 1 to 3 years. In addition, the people's courts at all levels shall not include the executee in the list of persons whose trust is broken under one of the following circumstances, in accordance with the provisions of Article 1, paragraph 1 of this provision:
 Where sufficient and effective security has been provided.
 Where the property which has been subject to measures of seizure, attachment, freezing, etc. is sufficient to satisfy the debts determined by the legal documents in force.
 Where the order of performance of the executee is later, for which enforcement shall not be enforced according to law.
 Other circumstances that do not belong to the ability to perform but refuse to fulfill the obligations determined by the effective legal documents.

In addition, if the executee is a minor, the people's courts at all levels shall not include him/her in the list of defaulted executors.

Information Publicity 
According to the "Several Provisions of the Supreme People's Court on the Publication of Information on the List of Defaulted Executees", the recorded and published information on the list of defaulted executes shall include the following:
 The name, unified social credit code (or organization code), and the name of the legal representative or person in charge of the legal person or other organization that is the executee.
 The name, gender, age, and ID number of the natural person who is the executee.
 The obligations determined by the effective legal documents and the performance of the executee.
 The specific circumstances of the executee's breach of trust.
 The production unit and document number of the basis of enforcement, the enforcement case number, the time of filing, and the enforcement court.
 Other matters that the people's court believes should be recorded and published that do not involve state secrets, commercial secrets or personal privacy.

On October 24, 2013, the information publication and query platform of the list of defaulted executors of the national courts (now China Execution Information Public Network) was opened to the society. The public can input the name or name of the executee to inquire the information of the defaulted executee, and the above information is announced to the public. In addition, local courts can also publish information on the list of defaulted executors through bulletin boards, newspapers, radio, television, the Internet, and press conferences. In recent years there have also been court advertisements for gaskets through cinema screenings of films, and the information on the list of defaulted executors is published in the form of Douyin and other social media. In July 2014, the Executive Bureau of the Supreme People's Court and People's Daily Online jointly launched the "Ranking of Defaulted Executees".

Disciplinary measures 
According to the Several Provisions of the Supreme People's Court on the Publication of Information on the List of Executed Persons in Default of Trust, the executed persons in default of trust will be subject to credit discipline in government procurement, bidding and tendering, administrative approval, government support, financing and credit, market access, qualification recognition, etc.; According to the Decision of the Supreme People's Court on Amending the Several Provisions of the Supreme People's Court on Restricting High Consumption of Executed Persons adopted at the 1487th Session of the Judicial Committee of the Supreme People's Court on May 17, 2010 and Amended in accordance with the Decision of the Supreme People's Court on Amending Certain Provisions of the Supreme People's Court on Restricting the High Consumption of the Executed Person adopted at the 1657th Meeting of the Judicial Committee of the Supreme People's Court on July 6, 2015Supreme People's Court on Restricting the High Consumption of the Executed Person and Related Consumption Several Provisions on Consumption" stipulates that persons (natural persons) included in the list of defaulted executors shall not engage in the following acts of high consumption and consumption not essential to life and work:
 Choosing airplanes, soft sleepers on trains, ships of second class or higher when taking transportation.
 High spending at hotels, hotels, nightclubs, golf courses, etc. above star level.
 Buying real estate or building new, expanded, or high-grade renovated houses.
 Leasing high-grade office buildings, hotels, apartments and other places for office work.
 Purchase of non-business essential vehicles.
 Travel, vacation.
 Children attending high-priced private schools.
 Paying high premiums for insurance and financial products.
 Riding all seats of G trains, first-class or above seats of other trains, and other consumption behaviors that are not necessary for life and work. (The regulation applies to all train trips of China National Railway Group in the Mainland and Hong Kong)

In addition to the above measures, executees included in the list of defaulted executors see their housing, bank accounts, pension, mobile payment accounts (such as Alipay, WeChat Pay, etc.) frozen and seized, and the executee is not allowed to serve as the legal representative, director, supervisor and senior management of any company nationwide, nor be allowed to enroll his or her children in private schools, and their speculation in stocks, leaving the country, taking out loans or applying for credit cards in financial institutions will also be restricted. At the same time, vehicles under the executor's name are not allowed to drive into the Expressways of the People's Republic of China, and once a vehicle under the executor's name enters or leaves an expressway toll booth, the vehicle will be suspended and transferred to the court by the highway enforcement brigade. According to the Criminal Law of the People's Republic of China Amendment (IX), which was implemented on November 1, 2015, people's court judgments and rulings have the ability to execute but refuse to do so, will be punished with "refusal to execute a judgment. For serious circumstances, the penalty shall be imprisonment for a term of up to three years, detention or a fine; if the circumstances are particularly serious, the penalty shall be imprisonment for a term of more than three years and up to seven years, and a fine.

Since July 2015, Zhima Credit, a subsidiary of Ant Group, and the Supreme People's Court have realized a system connection to update the data of defaulted executors in real time. Once Alipay users are included in the list of defaulted executors, their Sesame Credit score will be deducted and their consumption and shopping behavior at Sesame Credit partner merchants will also be restricted. In addition, there are also some places that cooperate with communication operators to set up exclusive colored ring for the defaulted executee, and the opening cannot be cancelled without the consent of the court. If the public calls the phone number under the name of the defaulted executee, an alert will be reported that the owner is listed as a defaulted executee. In Beijing, people who are included in the list of defaulted executors are not allowed to participate in the minibus lottery.

According to a press conference held by the Supreme People's Court on July 10, 2018, as of July 2018, there were 7.89 million cases of defaulted executors in mainland China under publication, involving 4.4 million defaulted executors. In terms of punishment, 12.22 million people have been restricted from purchasing air tickets, 4.58 million people have been restricted from purchasing tickets for moving trains and high-speed trains, and 280,000 people have been restricted from serving as legal representatives and executives of enterprises. Nationwide, 2.8 million defaulted executors are forced to fulfill their obligations automatically due to the pressure of credit discipline.

Notable people
Prominent persons included in the list of defaulted executors
 Huang Hongming, former chairman of Guangdong Chuang Hong Group. 2014, he was listed on the list of defaulted executors for violating the property reporting system
 Jia Yueting, founder and former chairman of LeEco. listed as a defaulted executee by the Beijing Third Intermediate People's Court on December 11, 2017
 Xu Zongheng, former mayor of Shenzhen Municipal People's Government, was sentenced to a suspended death sentence for taking bribes in 2011. He was later included in the list of defaulted executors by the Zhengzhou Central Court on July 17, 2018 for failing to fulfill his obligation to "forfeit all his personal property" as determined by the effective legal instrument
 Sun Huahua, former chairman of the board of directors of Dahua New Material, a New Third Board company, applied for resignation as chairman of the board of directors in March 2018 due to personal inclusion as a defaulted executee
Dai Wei, founder and CEO of OFO. listed by the Beijing Haidian District People's Court on December 4, 2018 as a defaulted executee
Michelle Ye, actress, was included in the list of defaulted executors by Shanghai Xuhui District People's Court in December 2018 and fined RMB 80,000 yuan on March 5, 2019 for refusing to fulfill her obligations
Pang Qingnian, Chairman of the Board of Directors of China Youth Automobile Group. As of May 2019 has been listed as a defaulted executee by the court 8 times
Shi Hongliu, the chairman of Hosa International, is listed by the court as a defaulted executor
 |Jiang Peizhen, the founder and chairman of Golden Voice Holding Group Co. Ltd Listed as a defaulted executee by Shanghai No. 1 Intermediate People's Court and Ningbo Yinzhou District People's Court for defaulting on 51,949,800 yuan in advertising fees and failing to fulfill financial loan contracts
 Luo Yonghao, CEO of Smartisan, was listed as a defaulted executor by the court for failing to fulfill the payment obligations determined by the effective legal documents
马平 , CEO of Jiangsu Heryo Group、宾利车主，listed as a defaulted executee by Zhangjiagang City People's Court on July 16, 2019 for violating the property reporting system

Wrongful cases 
On January 8, 2015, Xia Song, a resident of Changsha, Hunan Province, was unable to purchase a soft sleeper ticket and apply for a loan because the court mistakenly included him in the "national list of defaulted executors of courts".

See also
 Blacklisting
 Blacklist (employment)
 
 Chinese social relations
 Human Rights in China
 Karma
 Reputation capital
 Reputation management
 Reputation system
 Social issues in China
 Social Credit System

References

External links
網易-湖北法院公布重大老賴名單

Credit
Mass surveillance
Data
Reputation management
 
Credit scoring
Nudge theory
Social status
Social systems
Social influence
Politics of China
 
Social information processing
Information society
Government by algorithm
Human rights abuses in China
Internet memes introduced in 2021